Yarouba Cissako (born 8 January 1995) is a French professional footballer who plays as a right-back.

Club career
Cissako is a product of AS Monaco's academy. During the 2014–15 season, he played on loan for Belgian side Zulte Waregem in the Belgian Pro League. He made his first team debut on 17 July 2014 in the UEFA Europa League qualifying round against Zawisza Bydgoszcz. He made 25 league appearances and scored one goal.

International career
Cissako was born in France and is of Malian descent. He is a youth international for France.

Notes

References

External links
 
 

1995 births
Living people
French footballers
Association football defenders
France youth international footballers
French sportspeople of Malian descent
Cergy Pontoise FC players
AS Monaco FC players
S.V. Zulte Waregem players
Belgian Pro League players
French expatriate sportspeople in Belgium
Expatriate footballers in Belgium
Sportspeople from Pontoise
Footballers from Val-d'Oise